Velizh is a town and the administrative center of Velizhsky District in Smolensk Oblast, Russia, located on the bank of the Western Dvina,  from Smolensk, the administrative center of the oblast. Population:

History
In the late 14th century, it used to be a border fortress of the Grand Duchy of Lithuania. Muscovy recaptured it in 1536, but it was restored to Lithuania in the 1582 Truce of Yam-Zapolsky. The town was returned to Russia under the terms of the First Partition of Poland. The houses of Nikolay Przhevalsky and Alexander Rodzyanko in the proximity to Velizh are open to the public as museums.

After the First Partition of Poland in 1772 the area was included into newly established Pskov Governorate, a giant administrative unit comprising what is currently Pskov Oblast and a considerable part of Belarus. After 1773, the area belonged to Velizhsky Uyezd of Pskov Governorate. In 1777, it was transferred to Polotsk Viceroyalty. In 1796, the viceroyalty was abolished and the area was transferred to Byelorussia Governorate; since 1802 to Vitebsk Governorate. Between July and October 1812, Velizh was occupied by the army of Napoleon advancing to Moscow. In 1924, Vitebsk Governorate was abolished, and Velizhsky Uyezds was transferred to Pskov Governorate.

In April 1823, Velizh was the site of an infamous blood libel incident, in which local Jews were wrongly accused of the murder of Christian boy who was found dead in a field. Based on the testimony of a drunk prostitute, over forty Jews were arrested and in 1826 the synagogues were closed. Some of the accused were not released until 1835.

On 1 August 1927, governorates were abolished, and Velizhsky District with the center in Velizh was established. It belonged to Velikiye Luki Okrug of Leningrad Oblast. On June 17, 1929, Velizhsky District was transferred to Western Oblast. On 23 July 1930, the okrugs were also abolished and the districts were directly subordinated to the oblast. On 17 September 1937, Western Oblast was abolished, and the district was transferred to Smolensk Oblast. During World War II, between July 1941 and September 1943, Velizhsky District was occupied by German troops.

Much of the town was destroyed during World War II. During the war, Velizh was occupied by the German Army from July 14, 1941 to September 20, 1943. In September 1942, German occupation forces murdered all but 17 of the town's 1,440 Jewish residents.

On 1 February 1963, during the abortive Khrushchyov administrative reform, Velizhsky District was merged into Demidovsky District, but on 12 January 1965 it was re-established.

Administrative and municipal status
Within the framework of administrative divisions, Velizh serves as the administrative center of Velizhsky District. As an administrative division, it is, together with seventeen rural localities, incorporated within Velizhsky District as Velizhskoye Urban Settlement. As a municipal division, this administrative unit also has urban settlement status and is a part of Velizhsky Municipal District.

Economy

Industry
In 2013, 35% of the industrial output of Velizhsky district was made by enterprises of textile industry, 17% by timber industry, and 10% by food industry. Most of these enterprises are located in Velizh.

Transportation
Paved roads connect Velizh with Smolensk, Nevel via Usvyaty, and Vitebsk. There are also local roads with bus traffic originating from Velizh.

The closest railway station is in Rudnya, on the railway connecting Smolensk with Vitebsk.

Culture and recreation
There is a local museum in Velizh.

Notable people
Vladimir Gorev, Belarusian Soviet military
Max Penson, Russian photographer and photojournalist
Baruch Poupko, Jewish American multi-lingual scholar and Orthodox Rabbi
 Jurka Vićbič, Belarusian writer, publicist and a prominent member of the Belarusian diaspora

References

Notes

Sources

External links
  Entry on Velizh at Mojgorod.ru 
 

Cities and towns in Smolensk Oblast
Vitebsk Voivodeship
Velizhsky Uyezd
Holocaust locations in Russia